Alfred Leon Vitali (26 July 1948 – 19 August 2022) was an English actor, best known for his collaborations with film director, Stanley Kubrick, as his personal assistant, and as an actor, most notably as Lord Bullingdon in Barry Lyndon.

Life and career
As he was growing up Vitali became interested in drama and decided to attend the London Academy of Music and Dramatic Art after his English teacher sent him a prospectus. Vitali guest-starred in a number of TV series in the early 1970s, appearing in Softly, Softly, Follyfoot, Roads to Freedom, Z Cars, Public Eye, The Fenn Street Gang, and Notorious Woman, among others. In 1973, he made his feature film debut in two movies: the Italian Super Bitch, directed by Massimo Dallamano, who had previously worked with Sergio Leone as a cinematographer in the first two of his Dollars Trilogy, and the television film Catholics, alongside Martin Sheen and Michael Gambon.

In 1974 Vitali met Stanley Kubrick, with whom he had a professional relationship for the rest of Kubrick's career. Vitali played Lord Bullingdon in Barry Lyndon, the title character's stepson. Kubrick and Vitali bonded during the shoot. As filming concluded, Vitali asked Kubrick if he could stay on, without pay, to observe the editing process, to which Kubrick agreed. Five years later, Kubrick sent Vitali a copy of Stephen King's The Shining and asked him to join the production of his next film. Vitali is credited in The Shining (1980) as "personal assistant to director".

In 1977 he portrayed Victor Frankenstein in Terror of Frankenstein, Calvin Floyd's adaptation of Mary Shelley's Frankenstein, where he met his future wife Kersti, who worked as costume designer on the shoot. The Vitalis then worked as costume designers in Birgitta Svensson's Mackan, after which Leon played a bit part in Svensson's next film, Inter Rail (1981). Leon and Kersti had two children, actress Vera Vitali and a son, videographer Max Vitali. Vitali also had a daughter, producer Masha Vitali, from his previous marriage to Helen Broom. Leon and Kersti eventually divorced. Leon was married to Sharon Messer from 2005 to his death in 2022.

Vitali teamed up with Kubrick again for Full Metal Jacket (1987), where he served both as casting director and assistant to the director. Twelve years later, Vitali was credited with the same titles in Kubrick's last film, Eyes Wide Shut (1999), in which Vitali also played Red Cloak. In the film, the words "fashion designer Leon Vitali" appear in a newspaper article that Tom Cruise's character reads.

After Kubrick's death, Vitali oversaw the restoration of both picture and sound elements for most of Kubrick's films. In 2004, Vitali was honoured with the Cinema Audio Society's President's Award for this work.

In 2017, Vitali was the subject of a documentary, Filmworker, directed by Tony Zierra and produced by Elizabeth Yoffe  which premiered at The Cannes Film Festival and screened at many U.S. and international film festivals including the London Film Festival in October 2017. In Filmworker,  Vitali was interviewed at length about his work with Kubrick. The film was broadcast by Film4 in the UK on 7 March 2019, followed by a showing of Kubrick's The Killing (1956).

Death
Vitali died on 19 August 2022 in Los Angeles, as announced by his family, The official social media presence for the Kubrick estate announced Vitali's death citing the incorrect date of 20 August 2022.

Other work
Vitali worked with filmmaker Todd Field, with whom he appeared in Eyes Wide Shut. Vitali is credited as "technical consultant" on Field's In the Bedroom (2001), and as "associate producer" on Field's Little Children (2006), where he also made a cameo appearance as "The Oddly Familiar Man".

He played the apothecary in Carlo Carlei's Romeo & Juliet (2013).

Acting filmography

References

External links
 
 Leon Vitali interview Combat Radio

1948 births
2022 deaths
People from Leamington Spa
English male film actors
English male television actors
20th-century English male actors
21st-century English male actors
Male actors from Warwickshire
English people of Italian descent